The 15 kilometre cross-country skiing event was part of the cross-country skiing programme at the 1984 Winter Olympics, in Sarajevo, Yugoslavia. It was the eighth appearance of the event at its length of 15 km. The competition was held on Monday, 13 February 1984 at Veliko Polje, Igman. Of the 91 athletes who started the race, 8 did not finish or were disqualified.

Gunde Svan of Sweden won gold, his first Olympic gold medal, being the youngest ever Olympic cross-country gold medallist. Defending Olympic champion and fellow Swede, Thomas Wassberg did not defend his title preferring to concentrate on other events. Ove Aunli of Norway was disqualified after finishing fifth for using illegal skate strokes at the climax of the race.

Results

References

External links
Official Olympic Report

Men's cross-country skiing at the 1984 Winter Olympics
Men's 15 kilometre cross-country skiing at the Winter Olympics